Tim Jordan may refer to:

Tim Jordan (American football) (born 1964), former linebacker in the National Football League
Tim Jordan (baseball) (1879–1949), professional baseball player
Tim Jordan (racing driver) (born 1984), American race car driver
Tim Jordan (sociologist), British sociologist
Timothy Jordan II (1981–2005), musician